Ivan Astruc (28 April 1876 – 9 April 1905) was an Australian rules footballer who played with Fitzroy in the Victorian Football League (VFL).

He died following a period of illness in 1905. Astruc remains the only Mauritian to play in the VFL/AFL.

Sources

External links

1876 births
1905 deaths
VFL/AFL players born outside Australia
Australian rules footballers from Victoria (Australia)
Fitzroy Football Club players
Mauritian emigrants to Australia